Fabiano Lima may refer to:
Fabiano de Lima Campos Maria, Brazilian footballer
Fabiano Lima Rodrigues, Brazilian footballer